In Tongues We Speak is a split EP album by Napalm Death and Coalesce.

Track listing

Credits
Napalm Death
Mark "Barney" Greenway - vocals
Jesse Pintado - lead guitar
Mitch Harris - rhythm guitar
Shane Embury - bass
Danny Herrera - drums

Coalesce
Sean Ingram - vocals
Jes Steineger - guitars
Stacy Hilt - bass
James Dewees - drums

1997 EPs
Split EPs
Napalm Death EPs
Earache Records EPs